Attorney General Major may refer to:

Charles Henry Major (1860–1933), Attorney General of Grenada
Elliot Woolfolk Major (1864–1949), Attorney General of Missouri

See also
General Major (disambiguation)